Mcneillia is a genus of flowering plants belonging to the family Caryophyllaceae.

Its native range is Southeastern Europe to Turkey.

Species
Species:

Mcneillia graminifolia 
Mcneillia moraldoi 
Mcneillia pseudosaxifraga 
Mcneillia saxifraga 
Mcneillia stellata

References

Caryophyllaceae
Caryophyllaceae genera